The North East Wales FA Challenge Cup is a football knockout tournament involving teams from in North Wales who play in leagues administered and associated with the North East Wales Football Association.

Previous winners
A full set of winners can be found below.

1960s

1969–70: – Brymbo Steelworks

1970s

1970–71: – Brymbo Steelworks
1971–72: – Bala Town
1972–73: – Gresford Athletic
1973–74: – Llangollen Town
1974–75: – Buckley Rovers
1975–76: – Rhosddu
1976–77: – Llay Welfare
1977–78: – Cefn Albion
1978–79: – Sunblest United
1979–80: – Buckley Town

1980s

1980–81: – Buckley Town
1981–82: – Brymbo Steelworks
1982–83: – Brymbo Steelworks
1983–84: – Llay Royal British Legion
1984–85: – Brymbo Steelworks
1985–86: – Mold Alexandra
1986–87: – Mold Alexandra
1987–88: – Mold Alexandra
1988–89: – Lex XI
1989–90: – Llay Royal British Legion

1990s

1990–91: – Lex XI
1991–92: – Gresford Athletic
1992–93: – Cefn Druids
1993–94: – Wrexham 
1994–95: – Wrexham 
1995–96: – Brymbo
1996–97: – Rhostyllen Villa
1997–98: – Wrexham 
1998–99: – Flexsys Cefn Druids
1999–2000: – Oswestry Town

2000s

2000–01: – Buckley Town
2001–02: – Buckley Town
2002–03: – Buckley Town
2003–04: – Bala Town
2004–05: – Buckley Town
2005–06: – Buckley Town
2006–07: – Bala Town
2007–08: – Bala Town
2008–09: – Lex XI
2009–10: – Buckley Town

2010s

2010–11: – Rhos Aelwyd
2011–12: – Cefn Druids
2012–13: – Buckley Town
2013–14: – Cefn Druids
2014–15: – Mold Alexandra
2015–16: – Cefn Druids
2016–17: – Gresford Athletic
2017–18: – Ruthin Town
2018–19: – Cefn Druids
2019–20: – Competition not completed - Covid-19 pandemic

2020s

2020–21: – No competition - Covid-19 pandemic
2021–22: – Ruthin Town

Number of competition wins

 Buckley Town – 9
 Brymbo Steelworks/ Byrmbo – 6
 Cefn Druids – 6
 Bala Town – 4
 Mold Alexandra – 4
 Gresford Athletic – 3
 Lex XI – 3
 Wrexham – 3
 Llay Royal British Legion – 2
 Ruthin Town – 2
 Buckley Rovers – 1
 Cefn Albion – 1
 Llangollen Town – 1
 Llay Welfare – 1
 Oswestry Town – 1
 Rhos Aelwyd – 1
 Rhosddu – 1
 Rhostyllen Villa – 1
 Sunblest United – 1

References

Football cup competitions in Wales
County Cup competitions
Football in Wales
1969 establishments in Wales